Ali Ismael Hassan (born 5 December 1966) is a Djiboutian long-distance athlete.

Hassan competed for his country at the 1988 Summer Olympics held in Seoul, he entered the 5000 metres where he came 14th in his heat so didn't qualify for the next round.

References

1966 births
Living people
Athletes (track and field) at the 1988 Summer Olympics
Olympic athletes of Djibouti
Djiboutian male long-distance runners